Tanarthrus is a genus of antlike flower beetles in the family Anthicidae. There are about 15 described species in Tanarthrus.

Species
These 15 species belong to the genus Tanarthrus:

 Tanarthrus alutaceus (LeConte, 1852)
 Tanarthrus andrewsi Chandler, 1984
 Tanarthrus brevipennis Casey, 1895
 Tanarthrus cochisus Chandler, 1975
 Tanarthrus coruscus Chandler, 1975
 Tanarthrus eximius Chandler, 1975
 Tanarthrus inhabilis Chandler, 1975
 Tanarthrus inyo Wickham, 1906
 Tanarthrus iselini Chandler, 1975
 Tanarthrus occidentalis Chandler, 1979
 Tanarthrus quitobaquito Chandler, 1975
 Tanarthrus salicola LeConte, 1875
 Tanarthrus salinus LeConte, 1851
 Tanarthrus tartarus Chandler, 1975
 Tanarthrus vafer Chandler, 1975

References

Further reading

 
 

Anthicidae
Articles created by Qbugbot